Bawali is a census town within the jurisdiction of the Nodakhali police station in the Budge Budge II CD block in the Alipore Sadar subdivision of the South 24 Parganas district in the Indian state of West Bengal.

History

The Mondals, the zamindars of Bawali, originally carried the title of Roy/ Rai. Shovaram was awarded the title of Mondal. Shovaram’s grandson, Rajaram, received the zamindari rights of 50 villages (including Budge Budge and Bawali), as a reward for his bravery, from the Raja of Hijli. They settled at Bawali around 1710. Rajaram’s grandson Haradhan, who enjoyed the patronage of the East India Company, and his sons built many temples in Bawali.

Geography

Area overview
Alipore Sadar subdivision is the most urbanized part of the South 24 Parganas district. 59.85% of the population lives in the urban areas and 40.15% lives in the rural areas. In the northern portion of the subdivision (shown in the map alongside) there are 21 census towns. The entire district is situated in the Ganges Delta and the subdivision, on the east bank of the Hooghly River, is an alluvial stretch, with industrial development.

Note: The map alongside presents some of the notable locations in the subdivision. All places marked in the map are linked in the larger full screen map.

Location

Bawali, Chak Kashipur, Chak Alampur, Dakshin Raypur and Poali form a cluster of census towns, as per the map of the Budge Budge II CD block on page 181 of the District Census Handbook 2011 for the South 24 Parganas.

Demographics
According to the 2011 Census of India, Bawali had a total population of 10,968, of which 5,709 (52%) were males and 5,259 (48%) were females. There were 894 people in the age range of 0 to 6 years. The total number of literate people was 8,694 (86.30% of the population over 6 years).

According to the 2001 Census of India, Bawali had a population of 10,200. Males constitute 53% of the population and females 47%. It has an average literacy rate of 76%, higher than the national average of 59.5%; with male literacy of 83% and female literacy of 69%. 9% of the population is under 6 years of age.

Infrastructure
According to the District Census Handbook 2011, Bawali covered an area of 3.62 km2. Among the civic amenities, the water supply involved over-head tank. It had 2,235 domestic electric connections. Among the educational facilities it had were 5 primary schools, 2 middle schools and 2 secondary schools.

Economy

Tourism
There are two luxury hotels at Bowaii – The Rajbari Bawali and Farmhouse.

Transport
A short stretch of local roads link Bawali to the Budge Budge Trunk Road.

Budge Budge railway station is located nearby.

Education
Bawali High School is a Bengali-medium coeducational institution, established in 1899. It has arrangements for teaching from class V to class XII.

Bawali Pallimongal High School is a Bengali-medium coeducational institution established in 1974. It has facilities for teaching from class VI to class XII.

Healthcare
Lakshmibala Dutta Rural Hospital, with 30 beds, at Bakrahat, is the major government medical facility in the Budge Budge II CD block.

References

External links
 A travel article on Bawali

Cities and towns in South 24 Parganas district
Neighbourhoods in Kolkata
Kolkata Metropolitan Area